Aloysius “Ochie” U. Baes (July 28, 1948 - December 21, 2006) was a Filipino environmental chemist, environmental and pro-democracy activist, educator and musician.

Late in his career, Baes was best known for his environmental activism, playing key roles in exposing the role of mining and logging companies in the 1991 Ormoc tragedy, the Marcopper mining disaster, the Rapu-rapu mining disaster, and in the campaign to hold the US military responsible for the toxic wastes left behind after the closure of Subic Naval Base and Clark Air Base.  He was also a key figure in the founding of Advocates of Science and Technology for the People (Agham) and of the Center for Environmental Concerns-Philippines (CEC-Phil).

Before all that, however, he was better known for his role in the resistance against the dictatorship of Ferdinand Marcos, for which his name is inscribed Bantayog ng mga Bayani memorial, which honors the martyrs and heroes who fought the dictatorship.  He is similarly honored at "Hagdan ng Malayang Kamalayan" memorial steps at his alma mater - the University of the Philippines Los Baños.

The protest songs he wrote while incarcerated under Martial Law became popular and influential, eventually being considered among the 'top hits of martial law' sung by detainees in political prisons throughout the Philippines.

See also 
 University of the Philippines Los Baños

References

1948 births
2006 deaths
Individuals honored at the Bantayog ng mga Bayani
Marcos martial law victims
University of the Philippines Los Baños alumni
University of the Philippines Los Baños people honored at the Bantayog ng mga Bayani
Artists and cultural workers honored at the Bantayog ng mga Bayani